Selahattin Ülkümen (14 January 1914 – 7 June 2003) was a Turkish diplomat and consul in Rhodes during the Second World War, who assisted the Jewish community in the island with Turkish citizenship to avoid them being deported during the Holocaust.  In 1989, Israel recognized him as among the Righteous Among the Nations, and listed his name at Yad Vashem.

Turkish and Greek Jews were deported to death camps from the island of Corfu.  But on the island of Rhodes, Turkey’s Consul, Selahattin Ülkümen, saved the lives of up to 50 people, among a Jewish community of some 2,000 after the Germans took over the island.  The German occupation followed Italy's removal of Benito Mussolini from power and its armistice with the Allies.

Background
Rhodes, inhabited almost entirely by ethnic Greeks, was occupied by the Ottoman Empire for 390 years, until 1912 when Italy imposed its rule on Rhodes and the other Dodecanese islands. The Germans took over in September 1943 after Italy withdrew from the war.  By the 1940s, the ethnic Jewish community numbered about 2,000, made up of people from Turkey, Greece, Italy and other Mediterranean countries, as well as those native to the island.

Ülkümen's interventions
On 19 July 1944, the Gestapo ordered all of the island’s Jewish population to gather at its headquarters: ostensibly they were to register for "temporary transportation to a small island nearby", but in reality they were gathered for transport to Auschwitz and its gas chambers.  Ülkümen went to the German commanding officer, General Ulrich Kleemann, to remind him that Turkey was neutral in World War II.  He asked for release of the Jews, including not only Turkish citizens but also their spouses and relatives, even though many of the latter were Italian and Greek citizens. At first the commander refused, stating that under Nazi law, all Jews were considered Jews foremost and had to go to the concentration camps.  Ülkümen responded with "under Turkish law all citizens were equal. We didn’t differentiate between citizens who were Jewish, Christian or Muslim."
    
Ülkümen told Kleeman that "I would advise my Government if he didn’t release the Jewish Turks it would cause an international incident. Then he agreed." The Jews protected by Ülkümen were released, though not until they were subjected to considerable additional harassment by the Nazi authorities.  Ülkümen continued to provide protection and moral support to those whom he had rescued and other Jews who remained on the island.  They feared suffering deportation, as they were required to report to the Gestapo daily and never knew whether or not they would be able to return home.

Soon after Ülkümen's gaining release of Turkish Jews, the Germans rounded up the other Jews on Rhodes, numbering 1,673 in all, and deported them to other parts of Greece.  From there, the Germans had them transported to extermination camps; only 151 of the group survived the war.

Nazi retaliation
In retaliation German planes bombed the Turkish consulate on Rhodes.  Killed in the bombing were Ülkümen’s wife Mihrinissa Ülkümen, leaving behind their newborn son Mehmet, as well as two consular employees.  The Germans quickly detained and deported Ülkümen to Piraeus on mainland Greece and confined him there for the remainder of the war.

During the next six months, Jewish Turks remaining on Rhodes were subjected to almost constant harassment by the Gestapo, which often detained them for long periods of time.  It did not deport them to concentration camps as earlier planned, presumably because of the disorder and other requirements for transport in the Third Reich during the last days of the war.

Finally, early in January 1945, the German commander Kleeman learned that representatives of the International Red Cross were to visit Rhodes to look into the situation of its population.  He ordered the remaining Jews on the island to go to Turkey, which they did the next day, traveling in small boats across a stormy sea to safety at the port of Marmaris.

After the war
Released at the end of the war, Ülkümen returned to Turkey.

He died in his sleep on 7 June 2003 in Istanbul, Turkey at the age of 89.

Legacy and honors
Maurice Soriano, the head of the 35-person Jewish community who remained in Rhodes after the war, recently stated, "I am indebted to the Turkish consul who made extraordinary efforts to save my life and those of my fellow countrymen."

Quincentennial Foundation Vice President, historian Naim Guleryuz, collected testimony from living survivors and applied to Israel for recognition of Ülkümen’s actions during the war.  On 13 December 1989, the Yad Vashem Foundation of Israel declared Ülkümen one of the Righteous Among the Nations.  His name was inscribed at the memorial and a tree planted in his honor at the "Path of the Righteous."
In 1998 Israel issued a postage stamp in Ülkümen's honor.
On 5 June 2012, the Selahattin Ülkümen school was inaugurated in the city of Van, built jointly by the Jewish Community of Turkey and the American Jewish Joint Distribution Committee.

See also
 History of the Jews in Turkey
 History of the Jews in Greece
 Kahal Shalom Synagogue
 Necdet Kent
 Behiç Erkin
 Namık Kemal Yolga
 List of Turkish diplomats

References

External links
 - The Rescuers: Selahattin Ülkümen in Rhodes
 – his activity to save Jews' lives at the Holocaust, at Yad Vashem website

1914 births
2003 deaths
20th-century Turkish diplomats
Turkish Righteous Among the Nations
Muslim Righteous Among the Nations
People from Antakya